Western Iowa Tech Community College (WITCC or WIT) is a public community college with five campuses in northwestern Iowa. The main campus is located in Sioux City; the other campuses are located in Mapleton, Le Mars, Denison and Cherokee. The institution offers associate degree and certificate programs.

History 
WITCC was founded in 1966. It was accredited in 1977 by the Higher Learning Commission.

In 2015, the college added a culinary program with associated instruction area, state-test kitchen, and dining area. The program graduated its first class in 2016 with 100% placement.

In November 2020, eight students from Chile sued WITCC, claiming that the school misrepresented a program in which students under J-1 visas were supposed to earn a scholarship in exchange for working in an internship in their field of study. The students alleged that they were instead placed in factory jobs irrelevant to their field, a situation they compared unfavorably to human trafficking. The college has disputed some allegations and promised to make changes to the program, but a second group of international students, including nine students from Brazil and two from Chile, filed a similar suit in January 2021.

In 2022, the National Junior College Athletic Association (NJCAA) and the Iowa Community College Athletic Conference (ICCAC) both approved WITCC to participate in the NJCAA Division II level in four sports: men’s basketball, women’s volleyball, men’s and women’s soccer, and competitive cheer. WITCC aims to see local student-athletes who are interested in attending junior college stay in the city. In addition to athletics, Western Iowa Tech will be offering competitive esports in 2023.

Campus 
The main campus is located near the corner of Stone Avenue and Gordon Drive in Sioux City. WITCC also has two main branch campuses in Denison, Iowa and Cherokee, Iowa, where there is also an on-campus conference center. Mapleton, Iowa and LeMars, Iowa also have "learning centers" that offer only a small number of classes. WITCC also offers online distance learning programs.

The college has undergone extensive renovations in recent years. The student learning environments in the Kiser Building and community meeting area in the Corporate College have been re-done. In 2014, another housing complex, Prairie Place, was added to the Sioux City Campus and a permanent WITCC Le Mars Center was opened.

A new student life and wellness center was opened in January 2012, named the Dunker Center after President Emeritus Robert E. Dunker. The two-story, 44,000 sq. foot facility contains a basketball court, two cross-court basketball courts, a volleyball court, and a three-lane walking/jogging track. Along the edges is a cardio fitness area with elliptical machines and treadmills, as well as a strength training room with free weights and Nautilus-style equipment. The college offers a selection of fitness classes in these facilities, made possible largely due to a challenge grant from The Kresge Foundation as well as community support.

Student housing
WITCC has three residence halls, Sun Ridge Court, Bur Oak Suites, and Prairie Place.  The three areas can house a combined total of around 540 students. Sun Ridge Court provides apartment-style housing, with one- and two-bedroom apartment units, and also family-style housing. Bur Oak Suites offers more traditional housing options, with four-bedroom/two-bath suites. Bur Oak Suites was erected in 2008 and includes common areas, a computer lab, a music room, a study room, and a community kitchen.  The Prairie Place residence hall, which opened in the fall of 2014, is similar to Bur Oak Suites in size and layout.

References

External links
Official website

Cherokee, Iowa
Community colleges in Iowa
Education in Cherokee County, Iowa
Education in Crawford County, Iowa
Education in Woodbury County, Iowa
Buildings and structures in Sioux City, Iowa
1966 establishments in Iowa
Educational institutions established in 1966